Northeastern York High School is a medium sized, suburban public school district in Manchester, York County, Pennsylvania. Located at 300 High Street, it is the sole high school in the Northeastern York School District. In 2017, Northeastern York High School reported an enrollment of 1,128 pupils in grades 9th through 12th. The school employed 73 teachers, yielding a student–teacher ratio of 15:1.

References

Schools in York County, Pennsylvania
Public high schools in Pennsylvania